Missouri State Penitentiary Warden's House, also known as the Missouri State Penitentiary Director's House, is a historic home located at Jefferson City, Cole County, Missouri. It was built in 1888 and updated by architect Morris Frederick Bell in 1907 in the Queen Anne style. It is a two-story, frame dwelling and sits on a rough limestone block foundation.  It features a rounded tower and two front porches.

It was listed on the National Register of Historic Places in 1990. It is located in the Capitol Avenue Historic District.

References

Individually listed contributing properties to historic districts on the National Register in Missouri
Houses on the National Register of Historic Places in Missouri
Queen Anne architecture in Missouri
Houses completed in 1907
Buildings and structures in Jefferson City, Missouri
National Register of Historic Places in Cole County, Missouri